This list comprises works of public art on permanent display in an outdoor public space in the county of Surrey, England. UK.  For brevity this does not include markers and milestones, parts of buildings or ornamental features to main bridges, stained glass and other artistic works attached to places of worship.  Art at Brookwood cemetery, the UK's most populous, are not listed here as its land is open to those paying their respects but private.

Indoor artworks are excluded from this list, including in the county's 11 district halls, at its University, schools and colleges, community halls and in the art museums and galleries in Surrey category.  Community project millennial tapestries and embroideries are on public display in visitor centres at Dunsfold, Holmbury St Mary and Sunbury-on-Thames.  Clock towers (including clock housings on metal posts) are excluded from the list such as in Abinger Hammer (although its colourful blacksmith sculpture striking a bell overhangs a public road), Bisley, Cobham, Epsom, and Sunbury.  Wikipedia's list of Grade I listed buildings in Surrey is a government-backed list of the top historical and architectural structures and ruins including the somewhat intact castles: Farnham, Guildford and Reigate.  Moved architecture/relics such as part of the Leptis Magna (Roman city) ruins and some fountains have been included, lacking practical purposes.

Burpham

Camberley

Chertsey

Chobham

Cranleigh

Dorking

East and West Horsley

Epsom and Ewell

Esher

Farnham

University for Creative Arts, Farnham campus

Frimley

Godalming

Guildford

University of Surrey

Haslemere

Leatherhead

Molesey

Reigate and Redhill

Runnymede

Staines-upon-Thames

Sunbury-on-Thames

Virginia Water

Weybridge

Whiteley Village

Woking

War memorials

References

Surrey
Buildings and structures in Surrey
 
Outdoor sculptures in England